Broadway Through a Keyhole, also billed as Broadway Thru a Keyhole, is a 1933 American pre-Code musical film produced by Twentieth Century Pictures and released by United Artists.

New York City speakeasy proprietress Texas Guinan appears as a fictionalized version of herself in the film. It also features early appearances by Lucille Ball, Ann Sothern, and Susan Fleming. The film is based on an original story by Broadway columnist Walter Winchell.

Plot
Racketeer Frank Rocci is smitten with Joan Whelan, a dancer at Texas Guinan's famous Broadway night spot. He uses his influence to help her get a starring role in the show, hoping that it will also get Joan to fall in love with him. After scoring a hit, Joan accepts Frank's marriage proposal, more out of gratitude than love. The situation gets even stickier when she falls for a handsome band leader during a trip to Florida. Can she tell Frank she's in love with someone else?

Cast
 Constance Cummings as Joan Whelan  
 Russ Columbo as Clark Brian  
 Paul Kelly as Frank Rocci  
 Blossom Seeley as Sybil Smith  
 Gregory Ratoff as Max Mefoofski  
 Texas Guinan as Tex Kaley
 Abe Lyman as Orchestra Leader
 Hugh O'Connell as Chuck Haskins
 Hobart Cavanaugh as Peanuts Dinwiddie
 Frances Williams as Frances Williams
 Eddie Foy, Jr. as Joan's partner
 George Mann as George Mann - Columnist
 C. Henry Gordon as Tim Crowley
 William Burress as Thomas Barnum
 Helen Jerome Eddy as Esther 
 Lucille Ball as Chorine (uncredited)
 Susan Fleming as Chorine (uncredited)
 Ann Sothern as Singer (uncredited)

External links

Review at pre-code.com

1933 films
1933 musical films
American musical films
American black-and-white films
Films about musical theatre
Films directed by Lowell Sherman
Films scored by Alfred Newman
Films set in New York City
Twentieth Century Pictures films
United Artists films
1930s English-language films
1930s American films